Anna-Lena Grönefeld and Květa Peschke were the defending champions, but chose not to participate together. Grönefeld was scheduled to play alongside Raquel Atawo, but the pair withdrew due to Atawo's abductor injury. Peschke teamed up with Nicole Melichar and successfully defended the title, defeating Mihaela Buzărnescu and Lidziya Marozava in the final, 6–4, 6–2.

Seeds

Draw

Draw

References

External Links
 Main draw

Doubles